Muni Kshamasagar was a Digambara monk initiated by Acharya Vidyasagar. He is also known for his poetry and writings which are widely quoted.

Life
Kshamasagar was born in the city of Sagar, Madhya Pradesh on 20 September 1957. His father Jeevan lal Singhai was a nephew of famous Sagar philanthropist Singhai Kundanlal, who was a longtime supporter of Ganesh Varni.

He was initiated as a Digambara monk on 20 August 1982 by Acharya Vidyasagar. He did his M. Tech from Sagar University and renounced the worldly life soon afterwards.

He opted Santhara (also called Sallekhna) on 13 March 2015 at 6.00 AM in Moraji Jain temple during his Chaturmas period. More than 50,000 people attended his funeral proceedings afterwards.

Works
Kshamasagar wrote "In Quest of the Self: The Life Story of Acharya Shri Vidyasagar" (आत्मान्वेषी), a biography of his teacher Āchārya Vidyadagar and was published by Bhartiya Jnanpith.

His poems have been collected and published in Hindi and English. His poetry works include the following published books. 
 "Pagdandi Suraj Tak" (1992)
 "Muni Kshamasagar ki Kavitayen" (1996). 
 Mukti (2000) 
 "Apna Ghar" (2005)
 "Aur Aur Apna" (2016) 
 "Karam Kaise Karein" is a collection of his discourses.
 He also wrote "Jain Darshan Paribhashika Kosh".

There is a famous quote dedicated to Acharya Vidyasagar by him.दीप उनका, रौशनी उनकी, मै जल रहा हूँ |रास्ते उनके, सहारा भी उनका, मै चल रहा हूँ |प्राण उनके हर साँस उनकी, मै जी रहा हूँ |

Notes

Sources

 Muni Kshamasagar's Bio on Maitree Samooh

External links

Shortfilm by Maitree Samooh on Muni Kshamasagar's Life मुनिश्री क्षमासागर जी महाराज की आत्मीय स्मृतियाँ, Biography, Maitree Samooh, Mar 14, 2016

Digambara monks
Indian Jain monks
21st-century Indian Jains
21st-century Jain monks
21st-century Indian monks
Indian Jain writers
People from Sagar, Madhya Pradesh
1957 births
2015 deaths